Đinh Thanh Trung (born 24 January 1988 in Hà Tĩnh, Vietnam) is a Vietnamese midfielder who currently plays for Hồng Lĩnh Hà Tĩnh and former  Vietnam national football team.

Professional career

Hanoi ACB
In January 2012, Trung was released from Hanoi ACB after an internal conflict in where he refused to play for the club in an April V-League match.

Quảng Nam
Trung joined V.League 2 side Quảng Nam in 2013 and helped team won their first V.League 1 title in 2017, their fourth season at V.League 1.

International goals

Vietnam U23

Vietnam
Scores and results list Vietnam's goal tally first.

Honours

Club
Quảng Nam
V.League 1:
 Winners : 2017

Individuals
 Vietnamese Golden Ball: 2017

External links

References 

1988 births
Living people
People from Hà Tĩnh province
Association football midfielders
Vietnamese footballers
Vietnam international footballers
V.League 1 players
Hanoi FC players
Quang Nam FC players
Footballers at the 2010 Asian Games
Asian Games competitors for Vietnam